The Hayes Conference Centre is a group of buildings in Swanwick, UK which are used for conferences and other functions. The building which now houses the centre's reception was built in the 1850s as a private residence and named Swanwick Hayes. Since the early 1910 however it has taken up its current usage, apart from the Second World War years when it was a POW camp for German and Italian prisoners. It was the second camp to fail to hold the famous German escapee Franz von Werra. The escape tunnel can still be seen at the conference centre.

The centre, which has had many additions to it since it opened, provides sleeping accommodation for up to 400 people in 274 rooms (11 of which are for disabled persons). Most rooms are en-suite though an ever decreasing number have shared washing and toilet facilities. There are two main dining rooms and full-time catering staff work there alongside cleaners and other workers. There are 30 rooms designed to hold meetings in. The largest two hold 420 and 400 with two other large ones holding 150 and 140. Other facilities include a bar, five a side football pitches, a games room and a chapel with room for 350. There are internet access points in many of the rooms.

Most of the clients using this  estate are Christian groups, as the centre has been run by the Christian Conference Trust since 1996. In addition, the centre is home to the Swanwick writers' summer school.

Exhibition and conference centres in England
Country houses in Derbyshire